Tomorrow We Die Alive (stylized as Tomorrow We Die ∆live) is the third studio album by American progressive metalcore band Born of Osiris. It was released through Sumerian Records on August 20, 2013.

The album debuted at 27 on the Billboard 200, selling 13,052 copies in the first week and has sold 51,000 copies as of October 2015.

Critical reception

The album has received mixed to positive reviews, with Allmusic saying that "the Chicago alt-metal sextet reins in their brand of extreme metalcore. Joey Buras' synthesized soundscapes play a bigger part on this release than on the more brutal last two outings, 2009's A Higher Place and 2011's The Discovery. Considering that the technical wizardry of the guitarists, bassist, and drummer were a huge draw for fans, pushing their instrumentation into the abyss of synthesized strings makes their wicked cacophony feel less jarring. Even so, the roar of lead vocalist Ronnie Canizaro adds a welcome, savage counterpoint to the melodic aspects of the album."

Track listing

Personnel
Credits for Tomorrow We Die Alive as listed on Allmusic:
Born of Osiris
 Ronnie Canizaro – lead vocals 
 Lee McKinney – guitars
 David Da Rocha – bass
 Joe Buras – keyboards, backing vocals
 Cameron Losch – drums

Production and recording
 Nick Sampson – engineering, editing, orchestration, production, programming 
 Lee McKinney – editing, engineering
 Joey Sturgis – mixing and mastering
 Jeff Dunne – drum editing
 Ash Avildsen – vocal production
 Shawn Keith – vocal production
 Allan Hessler – vocal engineering

Artwork and layout design
 Cameron Gray – artwork 
 Amanda Fiore – booking 
 Daniel McBride – layout design

Promoting
 Carl Severson – management 
 George Vallee – publicity

Charts

References

2013 albums
Sumerian Records albums
Born of Osiris albums